Pripor Nunatak (‘Nunatak Pripor’ \'nu-na-tak 'pri-por\) is the ridge extending 3 km in northeast-southwest direction and 600 m wide, rising to 370 m on the southwest side of Lassus Mountains in northern Alexander Island, Antarctica. It is crescent-shaped facing south-southeast, with steep and mostly ice-free northwest slopes, and surmounts Lazarev Bay to the northwest. The feature is named after the historical settlement of Pripor in Southeastern Bulgaria.

Location

Maps
 British Antarctic Territory. Scale 1:200000 topographic map. DOS 610 – W 69 70. Tolworth, UK, 1971
 Antarctic Digital Database (ADD). Scale 1:250000 topographic map of Antarctica. Scientific Committee on Antarctic Research (SCAR). Since 1993, regularly upgraded and updated

Notes

References
 Bulgarian Antarctic Gazetteer. Antarctic Place-names Commission. (details in Bulgarian, basic data in English)
 Pripor Nunatak. SCAR Composite Gazetteer of Antarctica

External links
 Pripor Nunatak. Copernix satellite image

Nunataks of Alexander Island
Bulgaria and the Antarctic